Manganese(II) diselenide is the inorganic compound with the formula MnSe2.  This rarely encountered solid is structurally similar to that of iron pyrite (FeS2).  Analogous to the description of iron pyrite, manganese diselenide is sometimes viewed as being composed of Mn2+ and Se22− ions, although being a semiconductor, MnSe2 is not appropriately described in formal oxidation states. The high‐resolution Mn 2p spectra of the MnSe2 has two distinct peaks at 642.2 and 653.9 electronvolts correspond to the Mn 2p3/2 and Mn 2p1/2 spin–orbit components, respectively. The energy difference (Δ 2p) of 11.7 eV confirms the presence of Mn4+ ions in the sample. A good correlation was observed with the literature value for the Mn4+ state. No peaks for Mn2+ ions were observed at 640–641 eV, which confirmed the formation of only the Mn4+ oxidation state with a d3 electronic configuration. The Se 3d spectra were deconvoluted into two well‐defined peaks (3d5/2 and 3d3/2) at a binding energy of 54.46 and 55.31 eV, respectively. These two peaks confirmed the presence of Se2− ions in MnSe2.

References

Selenides
Manganese(II) compounds
Transition metal dichalcogenides